Elieshi Lema (born 1949) is a Tanzanian writer and publisher, also active in Tanzania's civil society.

Biography
Lema was born in the village of Nronga and grew up there. She studied library science and worked at the national library. She continued her education by studying English literature at the University of Dar es Salaam and creative writing at San Francisco State University.

Lema began writing poetry and then children's books in Swahili. Her short story Mwendo dealt with cultural practices harmful to the girl child in Tanzania. In 2001, she wrote her first novel titled Parched Earth in English. This novel has been translated into Swedish and French and received honourable mention for the Noma Award for Publishing in Africa. Another of her books for young adults in English, called In the Belly of Dar es Salaam, was on the shortlist for the Burt Award for African Literature.

As a co-editor, she also published works by Tanzania's first president Julius Nyerere, titled Nyerere on Education: Selected Essays and Speeches.

Lema is co-owner of the publishing house E&D Vision Publishing, which also operates a book café in Dar es Salaam. E&D Vision Publishing mainly has published children's books, textbooks and titles about African history, both in Swahili as well as in English. In 1998, they published the first booklet for young readers on the history of the Dinosaurs of Tendaguru, which also became known as recommended reading in Kenyan schools.

Both as a writer of young adult literature as well as a publisher and educator, Lema has focussed on books for children as the basis for a publishing industry in her country. She is also a founding director for the Tanzania Cultural Trust Fund. Further, she has served on the board for the African Publishers Network, Haki Elimu, the Tanzania Gender Networking Programme, the Tanzania Media Fund and on the executive board for the Publishers Association of Tanzania, as well as the Children's Book Network.

In an interview about her experience about the challenges of building a sustainable reading culture in East Africa, she said:

Selected works 
as author:
 Safari ya Prospa (Prospaʹs journey) 1995
 Mwendo , 1998
 Parched Earth, 2001
 The Man from Tanga : A Reader on HIV, 2007
 In the Belly of Dar es Salaam, 2011
 with graphic artist M Sagikwa: Ndoto Ya Upendo, 2017

as editor:
 The Future of African Indigenous Publishing: Report of the Dag Hammarskjold Foundation Seminar Held at Arusha, Tanzania , March 25th-28th 1996.
 with I.M Omari and Rakesh Rajani: Nyerere on Education: Selected Essays and Speeches. Dar es Salaam: Haki Elimu, 2006

References

External links 

 Review of Parched Earth on literary blog 'Around the World in 180 Books'

1949 births
Living people
Tanzanian novelists
Tanzanian poets
University of Dar es Salaam alumni
San Francisco State University alumni
Swahili-language writers
English-language writers from Tanzania
Tanzanian librarians
Women librarians